The Budapest Semesters in Mathematics program is a study abroad opportunity for North American undergraduate students in Budapest, Hungary.  The coursework is primarily mathematical and conducted in English by Hungarian professors whose primary positions are at Eötvös Loránd University or the Alfréd Rényi Institute of Mathematics of the Hungarian Academy of Sciences.  Originally started by  László Lovász, László Babai, Vera Sós, and Pál Erdős, the first semester was conducted in Spring 1985.  The North- American part of the program is currently run by Tina Garrett (North American Director) out of St. Olaf College in Northfield, MN.  She is supported by Kendra Killpatrick (Associate Director) and Eileen Shimota (Program Administrator). The former North American Directors were Paul D. Humke (1988–2011) and Tom Trotter. The Hungarian director is  Dezső Miklós. The first Hungarian director was Gábor J. Székely (1985–1995).

History of the Program

Courses offered
Courses commonly offered at BSM:
 Introduction to Abstract Algebra
 Advanced Abstract Algebra
 Topics in Analysis
 Complex Functions
 Combinatorics 1
 Combinatorics 2
 Commutative Algebra	
 Conjecture and Proof 	
 Functional Analysis
 Elementary Problem Solving
 Galois Theory 	
 Topics in Geometry 	
 Graph Theory  	
 Number Theory
 Topics in Number Theory 	
 Probability Theory 	
 Real Functions and Measures
 Set Theory
 Introduction to Topology
 Mathematical Physics
 Independent Research Groups
 Theory of Computing 	
 Differential Geometry
 Dynamical Systems and Bifurcations
 Stochastic Models in Bioinformatics
 Mathematical Logic

In addition to mathematics-based courses, students have the opportunity to take culture classes, such as beginning and intermediate Hungarian Language classes, Hungarian Arts and Culture, and Holocaust and Memory.

Location
Classes are held in the College International, located at Bethlen Gábor Tér in the heart of Pest in Budapest's District VII. This is also the location for several other programs which attract both Hungarian and international students. Entry to the building is monitored; each student receives a card that electronically admits him or her to the building. There are also cameras to monitor movement exterior to the building. Several tram and bus lines have stops near the school, as does the Red Metro Line, which stops at Keleti railway station.

Optional intensive language course
Prior to classes starting, students can arrive early to attend an optional two-week, 80-hour intensive language course at the Babilon Nyelvstúdió. Babilon is located at Astoria, right in front of Budapest's Great Synagogue. For approximately eight hours each day, students are immersed in the language, learning numbers, greetings, and other necessary vocabulary.

See also
 The North American home page of the program
 The Hungarian home page of the program (in English)
 The page for the intensive language course
 Math in Moscow is a similar program held in Moscow, Russia.

References

 Paul D. Humke: Math majors study abroad in beautiful Budapest, Math Horizons, April 1999, 10-13.

Mathematics education
Study abroad programs